Yashwant Dev (1 November 1926 – 30 October 2018) was a Marathi poet and composer from Maharashtra, India. He has contributed scores for many Marathi and Hindi movies.

Career
Dev was taught music by his father and made his public debut at All India Radio as a sitar player. He worked for Akashwani's Nagpur station in 1960s. He gained wide recognition once he launched the TV program Bhavsaragam, which helped make him popular across the Indian state of Maharashtra. After his first wife's death, he married Karuna Dev (nee Desai), more famous by her name Neelam Prabhu during her marriage to Marathi stage actor Baban Prabhu when she was a major star in AIR's Shrutikaa program. For both of them, it was their second marriage after the death of first spouse.

Yashwant Dev had contributed music for over 40 plays in Marathi.

Death
Dev died of pneumonia at the Shushrusha Citizens' Co-operative Hospital in Dadar, Mumbai on the 30th of October 2018 and at the age of 91, following a battle with the chikungunya virus. His wife Karuna Dev had predeceased him, around 2010.

Awards and recognition

 Lata Mangeshkar award
 2012- Ga Di Ma pratishthan award
 Ram Kadam kalagaurav award 2015

Works

Poems written
 अरे देवा तुझी मुले अशी का रे भांडतात, कुणी एकत्र नांदती कुणी दूर दहा हात Are deva tuzi mule ka re bhandtat
 अशी धरा असे गगन कधी दिसेल का? Ashi dhara ase gagan kadhi disel ka?
 अशी ही दोन फुलांची कथा, एक शिवाच्या पदी शोभते एक शवाच्या माथा Ahi hi don fulanchi katha
 आयुष्यात खूप चौकटी पाहिल्या Aayushyat kjup choukati pahilya
 करिते जीवनाची भैरवी Karite jivanachi bhairavi
 कामापुरता मामा Kamapurta mama
 कोटि कोटि रूपे तूझी कोटी सूर्य चंद्र तारे Koti koti rupe tuzi koti surya Chandra tare
 कृष्णा उडवू नको रंग Krushna udavu nako rang
 चंद्राविना ठरावी जशी Chnadravina tharavi jashi
 जीवनात ही घडी अशीच राहू दे  Jivanat hi ghadi ashich rahude
 तुझी झाले रे Tuzi zale re
 तुझ्या एका हाकेसाठी Tuzya eka hakesathi
 तू नजरेने हो म्हटले पण वाचेने वदणार कधी Tu najarene ho mhatale pan 
 तेच स्वप्न लोचनांत Tech Swapan lochnat
 त्याची धून झंकारली Tyachi dhoon zankarali
 दत्तगुरूंचे दर्शन घडले Dattagurunche darshan ghadle
 दिवाळी येणार अंगण सजणार Diwali yenar anand sajnar
 नीज रे नीज रे बाळा Neej re neej re bala
 प्रिया आज माझी नसे साथ द्याया Priya aaj mazi mazi nase sath dyaya
 प्रिया साहवेना आता Priya sahvena aata
 प्रेमगीते आळविता Premgite aalvita
 भारतमाता परमवंद्य धरा Bharat mata pramvandy dhara
 मन हे खुळे कसे Man he khule kase
 मने दुभंगली म्हणून जोडता येत नाही Mane dubhangli mhanun jodta yet nahi
 माणसांच्या गर्दीत माणूस माणसाला शोधत आहे Mansachya gardit manus mansala shodhat aahe
 यश अंती लाभणार Yash anto labhnar
 येतो तुझ्या आठवणींचा घेऊन सुगंध वारा Yeto tuzya aathvanincha ghevun Sugandh vara
 रात्रिच्या धुंद समयाला Ratrichya dhund samayala
 लागेना रे थांग तुझ्या Lagena re thang tuzya
 विश्वाचा खेळ मांडिला आम्ही Vishwacha khel mandila aamhi
 शब्दमाळा पुरेशा न Shabdmala puresha n
 श्रीरामाचे चरण धरावे दर्शन मात्रे पावन व्हावे Shriramache charan dharave
 स्वर आले दुरुनी, जुळल्या सगळ्या त्या आठवणी  Swar aale duruni

Music given
 अखेरचे येतिल माझ्या Akherche yetil mazya
 अपुल्या हाती नसते काही Apulya hati nasate kahi
 अंबरात नाजुकशी Ambarat najukashi
 अरे देवा तुझी मुले अशी Are deva tuzi mule ashi
 अर्धीच रात्र वेडी Ardhich ratr vedi
 अशी धरा असे गगन Ashi dhara ase gagan
 अशी पाखरे येती आणिक Ashi pakhare yeti
 असेन मी नसेन मी Asen mi nasen mi
 आज राणी पूर्विची ती Aaj rani purvichi ti
 आठव येतो मज Aathav yeto aaj
 आम्हींं जावें कवण्या Aamhi jave kavanya
 आळवितां धांव घाली Aalvita dhav ghali
 उघडी नयन शंकरा ughadi nayan shankra
 एवढेतरी करून जा Evadhetari karun ja
 करिते जीवनाची भैरवी Karite jivanachi bhairavi
 कामापुरता मामा Kamapurta mama
 काही बोलायाचे आहे Kahi bolayache aahe
 कुठला मधु झंकार Kuthla madhu zankar
 कुठे शोधिसी रामेश्वर Kuthe shodisi rameshwar
 कुणि काहि म्हणा Kuni kahi mhana
 कुणि जाल का Kuni jaal ka
 केळीचे सुकले बाग Keliche sukale baag
 कोण येणार ग पाहुणे Kon yenar ga pahune
 कृष्णा उडवू नको रंग Keushna udavu nako rang
 गणपती तू गुणपती तू  Ganapati tu Ganapati tu 
 मन्त्रपुष्पांजली (He rendered it in the traditional style, not his new tune, upon Hridaynath Mangeshkar's request)

References

Indian male poets
Marathi-language poets
Dev, Yashwant
People from Sindhudurg district
2018 deaths
1926 births
Poets from Maharashtra
20th-century Indian poets